John Hipwell (1948–2013) was an Australian rugby player.

John Hipwell is also the name of:

John Hipwell (architect) (1920–2007), Australian architect